Reginald or Reg Davies may refer to:

Reg Davies (footballer, born 1929) (1929–2009), Welsh international football player
Reg Davies (footballer, born 1933), English football player
Reg Davies (politician) (born 1943), Australian politician
Reginald Davies (footballer, born 1897) (1897–1977), English football player
Reg Davies (Australian footballer) (1909–1987), Australian rules footballer